Dale Charles Buggins (1961–1981) was an Australian stunt motorcyclist who had built a national and international reputation by the age of 20. At 17, Buggins broke a world record previously held by American stuntman Evel Knievel when he jumped 25 cars with a Yamaha dirt bike, in 1978.

Early life 
Buggins was born to parents Jan and Ken in Carmarthen, Wales, and immigrated to Australia with his family at the age of 7 months. His interest in motorcycles began at the age of nine, when his father gave him a small motorbike powered by a lawnmower engine. In just a few years he was riding an XR75 Honda and doing jumps off car bonnets like the others at the local dirt bike track, known as the "Dude Ranch" near Umina on the Central Coast of NSW. A schoolfriend recalls:
Any given afternoon when school had finished, and on weekends there would be all kids blasting around kicking dirt up. Buggo to us, or Dale would be going hard, wheelies, jumps, big power slides, it was something to see. Dale was a school friend of mine at Woy Woy South Primary School, and Woy Woy High where he did very well in all subjects. I have pictures of Dale in our Rugby team. In 1976 he moved with his family to Wyong where he honed his jumping skills on a farm jumping cars. Dale became a sensation with his stunt shows, the rest is history.

Career 
Buggins's work pre-dated Freestyle Motocross and the Crusty Demons by 10-plus years. In that sense, at least in Australia, he was a stunt motorbike pioneer like his idol, Evel Knievel.

On 28 May 1978 Buggins broke Knievel's world record by jumping over 25 cars at the Newcastle Motordome and by 1979 he was touring the U.S. in the "Evel Knievel Spectacular". In 1980 he visited Seattle in the United States to perform with American stunt motorcyclist Gary Wells.

Jumping everything from cars to buses, Buggins also created a unique motorcycle high wire act with his sister Chantel. He toured the "Dale Buggins Spectacular", in the States and Australia, appearing at the Sydney Royal Easter Show and others around the country. A documentary made with Buggins, Mud Sweat and Gears, by Douglas Stanley and Nomad Films was never released in Australia but can be found on YouTube.

Buggins's record has since been broken by fellow Australian FMX stunt rider Robbie Maddison.

Death and memorial 

Buggins died by suicide on 18 September 1981 in the Marco Polo Hotel in Melbourne, by shooting himself in the chest with a rifle that he purchased the previous day. Buggins had just returned from touring the U.S, with his sister Chantell, and was in Melbourne for the Royal Melbourne Show where he was scheduled to appear.

His father and younger sisters, Chantell (who subsequently quit showbusiness) and Emma, appeared in the Channel 9 special in 1997.

The National Motorcycle Museum in Nabiac in NSW, Australia, has a section of wall devoted to images and memorabilia of Dale Buggins's career. Another museum, The Stuntman and Daredevil Hall of Fame, which will include Dale Buggins memorabilia is planned for Junee, in 2011–2012. A tribute, "Song For Dale", was recorded by Melbourne band Lost Ragas on Transatlantic Highway LP.

Bibliography 
The only book to exist so far is a biography, Defying Gravity, The Dale Buggins Story (by Damian Kringas, Independence Jones 2009). For more background, Ian B. Jamieson's Bring on the Stuntman! gives a detailed account of the "Evel Knievel Thrill Spectacular", which Buggins was part of.

Video and film 
A number of short videos recording his development and stunts, including snatches of Dale Buggins himself, include: 
Dale Buggins retro video
Douglas Stanley documentary, Mud, Sweat and Tears about Dale Buggins work and life.[see YouTube]
Dale Buggins Tribute with Jennifer Keyte, Channel 9 Television, 1997

See also 
Robbie Maddison
Evel Knievel
Motorcycle stunt riding

References

External links 
 Official fan page
 Dale Buggins story with photographs

1961 births
1981 deaths
Australian stunt performers
Motorcycle stunt performers
Suicides by firearm in Victoria (Australia)
1981 suicides